Borodino is a rural locality (a village) in Klyapovskoye Rural Settlement, Beryozovsky District, Perm Krai, Russia. The population was 7 as of 2010.

Geography 
It is located 7.5 km south-east from Beryozovka.

References 

Rural localities in Beryozovsky District, Perm Krai